Southwark West was a parliamentary constituency centred on the Southwark district of South London.  It returned one Member of Parliament (MP)  to the House of Commons of the Parliament of the United Kingdom.

The constituency was created for the 1885 general election, and abolished for the 1918 general election.

Members of Parliament

Elections

Elections in the 1880s

Cohen resigned, causing a by-election.

Elections in the 1890s

Causton was appointed a Lord Commissioner of the Treasury, requiring a by-election.

Elections in the 1900s

Elections in the 1910s

General Election 1914–15:

Another General Election was required to take place before the end of 1915. The political parties had been making preparations for an election to take place and by the July 1914, the following candidates had been selected; 
Liberal: Edward Strauss
Unionist:

References 
 

Parliamentary constituencies in London (historic)
Constituencies of the Parliament of the United Kingdom established in 1885
Constituencies of the Parliament of the United Kingdom disestablished in 1918
Politics of the London Borough of Southwark